Lorenzo Bettini (born 15 January 1931 in Villanuova sul Clisi; died 21 January 2008 in Gavardo) was an Italian professional football player.

1931 births
2008 deaths
Italian footballers
Association football forwards
Serie A players
Serie B players
Brescia Calcio players
A.S. Roma players
Palermo F.C. players
Udinese Calcio players
S.S. Lazio players
Inter Milan players
Modena F.C. players
U.S. Alessandria Calcio 1912 players